Timandra was launched in 1814. She started trading with India and made one voyage for the British East India Company (EIC) before she was lost off the Lofoten Islands in 1822.

Career
Timandra quickly began trading with the India and South East Asia under a license from the EIC. She first appeared in the Register of Shipping in 1816.

EIC voyage (1820-1821): Captain John Price sailed from Falmouth on 19 July 1820, bound for Bengal. Timandra arrived at Calcutta on 31 January 1821. Homeward bound, she passed Saugor on 3 April, reached Saint Helena on 19 July, and arrived at the Downs on 10 September.

On her return Timandras master changed from Price to E. Marshall, her owner from Dingwell to J. Benson, and her trade from Liverpool—Bengal to London—Baltic.

Loss
Her crew took to their boats and arrived at Bodoe three days later. The mate and seven men arrived at Drotheim on 27 September. The master and six men stayed at Bodoe. She was on a voyage from Archangelsk, Russia to London.

Citations and references
Citations

References

1814 ships
Age of Sail merchant ships
Merchant ships of the United Kingdom
Ships of the British East India Company
Maritime incidents in September 1822